Jacqueline Bobo is Chair and Associate Professor of Women's Studies at the University of California, Santa Barbara.

Education 
She earned her undergraduate degree from the University of California, Los Angeles in 1971, her masters in 1980 at San Francisco State University, and her PhD in film and television at the University of Oregon in 1989.

Career 
Bobo has worked on studying the response of Black women for films such as Daughters of the Dust, The Color Purple, Gone with the Wind, Civil Brand, To Kill a Mockingbird, and Claudine. She interviewed a group of selected Black women and asked them how they felt about their portrayal in the 1985 film The Color Purple. She has analyzed the language used in media representing Black women and how it has changed within the last century. Bobo's observations contextualize the historical aspects perceived in these media outlets.

Selected works

Articles

Books

References 

American feminists
Feminist studies scholars
Women of African descent
University of California, Santa Barbara faculty
University of California, Los Angeles alumni
San Francisco State University alumni
University of Oregon alumni
Year of birth missing (living people)
Living people